Sami Khan Solanki (born 1958 in Karachi, Pakistan) is director of the Max Planck Institute for Solar System Research (MPS), director of the Sun-Heliosphere Department of MPS, a scientific member of the Max Planck Society, and a Chair (and spokesperson) of the International Max Planck Research School on Physical Processes in the Solar System and Beyond at the Universities of Braunschweig and Göttingen.

Solanki is also an Honorary Professor at the Institute of Astronomy at the Swiss Federal Institute of Technology Zurich, and (2) Institute for Geophysics and Extraterrestrial Physics at the Braunschweig University of Technology in Germany. In addition, he is a Distinguished Professor at the Kyung Hee University in Korea.

He is the editor-in-chief of the Living Reviews in Solar Physics, an exclusively web-based, peer-reviewed journal, publishing reviews of research in all areas of solar and heliospheric physics. Living Reviews in Solar Physics was recently rated with an impact factor of 17.636 taking the third place in the "Astronomy & Astrophysics" category.

Solanki's main topics of research are:     
 Solar and heliospheric physics, in particular solar magnetism and Sun-Earth relations
 Stellar astrophysics, mainly stellar activity and magnetism
 Astronomical tests of theories of gravitation
 Atomic and molecular physics of astronomical interest
 Protoplanetary discs and extrasolar planets
 Radiative transfer of polarised light

He has also held these positions: (1) Vice-Chairman and member of the Senate Committee of the German Aerospace Centre (DLR); (2) Member Appointment Committee and Committee of Three of the DLR; (3) Member Extraterrestrial Program Committee of the DLR; (4) Science Advisory Committee of the High Altitude Observatory, Boulder/USA; (5) Science Advisory Board at the Istituto Ricerche Solari (IRSOL), Locarno/Switzerland; and has contributed to the following space/balloon projects:
 Sunrise (PI)
 STEREO Secchi (Co-I)
 SDO HMI (Co-I)
 Solar Orbiter PHI (PI)

Academic career
 1987 Doctorate from the Eidgenössische Technische Hochschule Zürich
 1987–1989 Post doc in St. Andrews, Scotland.
 1992 Habilitation
 1998 Professor of Astronomy at the University of Oulu in Finland
 1999 Minnaert guest professor at the University of Utrecht
 1999 Director of the Max Planck Institute for Solar System Research

Awards and honours
 2001 Honorary professor at the Eidgenössische Technische Hochschule
 2003 Honorary professor at the Technische Universität Braunschweig
 2006 Associateship of the Royal Astronomical Society
 2008 Presented the Bernard Price Memorial Lecture in South Africa
 2022 George Ellery Hale Prize

In 2011, Solanki delivered a lecture, "Is the Sun to Blame for Global Warming?,” at the first Starmus Festival in the Canary Islands. His talk was subsequently published in the book Starmus: 50 Years of Man in Space.

Controversy
Solanki's research has been quoted as being part of the Global warming controversy, for instance in an article in the Telegraph.co.uk in 2004 as taking a sceptical position: But the same research has been quoted as being evidence for global warming in a news release from the Max Planck Society though he is quoted as calling for further investigation, saying:

Selected Publications

References

External links
 Personal webpage at the Max Planck Institute for Solar System Research
 How Strongly Does the Sun Influence the Global Climate? Press Release 4 August 2004 by the Max Planck Institute
 Sonne und Treibhausgase heizen ein (en:The Sun and Greenhousegases warm up) Press release 19 February 1998 by the ETHZ
 Department Sun and Heliosphere
 ''The sun is more active now than over the last 8000 years'' NASA press release from 2004
 
  

1958 births
Living people
Pakistani astronomers
Science teachers
Pakistani science journalists
Academic staff of Utrecht University
Max Planck Society people
Pakistani emigrants to Germany
Writers from Karachi
German people of Pakistani descent
Academic staff of ETH Zurich
Max Planck Institute directors